Kruununhaka is a neighbourhood of Helsinki, the capital of Finland.

Kruununhaka became the area next to the harbour and the center, when Helsinki was moved from the earlier location in the mid-1660s. From the very beginning, the residents included city and state officials.

Many buildings of the University of Helsinki are also situated in Kruununhaka.  The area has become known for its vintage shops.

Notable people
Kirka Babitzin, singer
Harri Holkeri, politician
Magnus Lindberg, composer 
Johannes Virolainen, politician
Bror-Erik Wallenius, sports commentator
Valtteri Bottas, racing driver

Gallery

See also 
 Katajanokka
 Kluuvi
 Pohjoisranta
 Ullanlinna
 Vironniemi

External links 

 
Vironniemi district